Jos Compaan (2 July 1958 – 30 December 2020) was a Dutch rower. She competed at the 1980 Summer Olympics, 1984 Summer Olympics and the 1988 Summer Olympics.

References

External links
 

1958 births
2020 deaths
Dutch female rowers
Olympic rowers of the Netherlands
Rowers at the 1980 Summer Olympics
Rowers at the 1984 Summer Olympics
Rowers at the 1988 Summer Olympics
People from Purmerend
Sportspeople from North Holland
21st-century Dutch women
20th-century Dutch women